Lambda Theta Phi Latin Fraternity, Inc. is a Latino non-profit social fraternity in the United States. It was founded on December 1, 1975, at Kean College in Union, New Jersey. It emphasizes Latin unity and the celebration of the Latin culture.  In 1992, Lambda Theta Phi was accepted into the North American Interfraternity Conference (NIC).  With its acceptance into the North American Interfraternity Conference in 1992 it became the first nationally recognized Latino Greek-lettered organization to be a part of the conference in the U.S. In 1994, with the release of The History of Lambda Theta Phi Latin Fraternity, Inc., the fraternity published a historical account about its organization.

Lambda Theta Phi has received commendations from the American Red Cross, Division of Youth and Family Services, and various other organizations for its fundraising efforts on behalf of victims of natural disasters and homelessness both in the U.S. and internationally. The fraternity's previous national philanthropy was the American Heart Association. On July 30, 2014, Lambda Theta Phi Latin Fraternity, Inc. signed a commitment to support Congressional Hispanic Caucus Institute's (CHCI) high school college readiness programs.

Founding Fathers
Lambda Theta Phi has 14 Founding Fathers:

Anti-hazing policy
The national organization has a policy against hazing.

Chapters

Notable members
 Robert "Bob" Menendez – U.S. Senator (NJ) (Honorary Brother)

See also
List of social fraternities and sororities

References

External links 

 
Student organizations established in 1975
National Association of Latino Fraternal Organizations
North American Interfraternity Conference
Student societies in the United States
Hispanic and Latino organizations
Latino fraternities and sororities
1975 establishments in New Jersey